Band-e Beni (also Romanized as Band-e Benī and Band Bonī) is a village in Peyrajeh Rural District, in the Central District of Neka County, Mazandaran Province, Iran. At the 2006 census, its population was 116, in 29 families.

References 

Populated places in Neka County